Sympistis barnesii is a species of moth in the family Noctuidae (the owlet moths).

The MONA or Hodges number for Sympistis barnesii is 10121.

References

Further reading

 
 
 

barnesii
Articles created by Qbugbot
Moths described in 1899